Edoardo Tresoldi is an Italian sculptor. He makes near-transparent sculptures using wire mesh, and often positions them in public places.

References

External links
 Art Vibes.com
 Official Website

21st-century Italian sculptors
Italian male sculptors
Italian contemporary artists
Postmodern artists
Living people
Year of birth missing (living people)
21st-century Italian male artists
Place of birth missing (living people)